The 1974 Canadian Grand Prix was a Formula One motor race held at Mosport Park on 22 September 1974. It was race 14 of 15 in both the 1974 World Championship of Drivers and the 1974 International Cup for Formula One Manufacturers.

Niki Lauda was on course for victory, until running over debris on lap 67, causing his Ferrari to spin into barriers, having led the whole race until that point. He also set the fastest lap of the race. Jacques Laffite was also forced out due to picking up a puncture, possibly caused by the same debris on the circuit. Emerson Fittipaldi grabbed the advantage, and led for the rest of the race. It was his 12th career victory, and the last of the season for the McLaren driver. This was the first Grand Prix race for young Austrian Helmuth Koinigg, who would lose his life during the next race at Watkins Glen.

Classification

Qualifying

*Positions with a pink background indicate drivers that failed to qualify

Race

Championship standings after the race

Drivers' Championship standings

Constructors' Championship standings

Note: Only the top five positions are included for both sets of standings. Only the best 7 results from the first 8 races and the best 6 results from the last 7 races counted towards the Championship. Numbers without parentheses are Championship points; numbers in parentheses are total points scored.

References

Canadian Grand Prix
Canadian Grand Prix
1974 in Canadian motorsport
Grand Prix